The following elections occurred in the year 1993.

Africa
 1993 Burundian legislative election
 1993 Burundian presidential election
 1993 Central African Republic general election
 1993 Comorian legislative election
 1993 Republic of the Congo parliamentary election
 1993 Djiboutian presidential election
 1993 Equatorial Guinean legislative election
 1993 Gabonese presidential election
 1993 Guinean presidential election
 1993 Lesotho general election
 1993 Malagasy parliamentary election
 1992–1993 Malagasy presidential election
 1993 Moroccan parliamentary election
 1993 Nigerian presidential election
 1993 Nigerien parliamentary election
 1993 Nigerien presidential election
 1993 Senegalese parliamentary election
 1993 Senegalese presidential election
 1993 Seychellois general election
 1993 Swazi parliamentary election
 1993 Togolese presidential election

Asia
 1993 Autonomous Region in Muslim Mindanao general election
 1993 Balochistan Provincial Assembly election
 1993 Iranian presidential election
 1993 Pakistani general election
 1993 Singaporean presidential election
 1993 Yemeni parliamentary election
 1993 Cambodian general election
 1993 Japanese general election

Europe
 1993 Croatian Chamber of Counties election
 1993 Greek legislative election
 1993 Jersey general election
 1993 Latvian parliamentary election
 1993 Lithuanian presidential election
 1993 Norwegian parliamentary election
 1993 Polish parliamentary election
 1993 Serbian parliamentary election
 1993 Spanish general election

France
 1993 French legislative election

Germany
 1993 Hamburg state election

Russia
 1993 Russian constitutional referendum
 1993 Russian government referendum
 1993 Russian legislative election

United Kingdom
 1993 Christchurch by-election
 1993 Northern Ireland local elections
 1993 Millwall by-election
 1993 Newbury by-election

United Kingdom local
 1993 United Kingdom local elections

North America
 1993 Belizean legislative election
 1993–1994 Belizean municipal elections
 1993 Guatemalan presidential election
 1993 Honduran general election

Canada
 1993 Canadian federal election
 1993 Alberta general election
 1993 Newfoundland general election
 1993 Nova Scotia general election
 1993 Prince Edward Island general election

Caribbean
 1993 Jamaican general election

United States

United States mayoral
 1993 Houston mayoral election
 1993 Los Angeles mayoral election
 1993 Pittsburgh mayoral election

United States gubernatorial
 1993 United States gubernatorial elections

Oceania
 1993 New Zealand general election
 1993 Niuean general election
 1993 Tauranga by-election
 1993 Tongan general election

Australia
 1993 Australian federal election
 1993 South Australian state election
 1993 Western Australian state election

South America
 1993 Argentine legislative election
 1993 Bolivian general election
 1993 Chilean presidential election
 1993 Falkland Islands general election
 1993 Venezuelan general election

See also

 
1993
Elections